John Lamb may refer to:
John Lamb (general) (1735–1800), U.S. Revolutionary War general and Anti-Federalist organizer
John Lamb (Australian politician) (1790–1862), New South Wales politician
John Lamb (congressman) (1840–1924), United States Congressman from Virginia
John Edward Lamb (1852–1914), U.S. Representative from Indiana
John Lamb (architect) (1859–1949), architect based in Nottingham
John Lamb (American football) (1873–1955), American football coach for Emporia State University
John Lamb (rugby union) (1907–1983), rugby union player who represented Australia
John Lamb (musician) (born 1933), jazz double bassist with the Duke Ellington Orchestra
John Lamb (right-handed pitcher) (born 1946), American baseball player
John Lamb (left-handed pitcher) (born 1990), American baseball player
John Lamb (producer), American film producer and director, animator, artist
John Lamb (footballer) (born 1893), English football half back
John Lamb (priest) (1789–1850), academic and Anglican priest
John Lamb (cricketer) (1912–1993), English cricketer

See also
John Lambe (disambiguation)